A myriad is an area 100 km × 100 km square i.e. it is 10,000 (one myriad) km2. 100 of these squares would be one million  km2.

The term has a particular use in connection with the British Ordnance Survey National Grid and the US Military Grid Reference System, where the grids are divided into 100 km × 100 km squares, each with a two letter prefix. For example, in an OS grid reference the prefix TL refers to the myriad 500 km east and 200 km north of the grid origin.

A myriad contains 100 hectads.

Units of area